The 1997 is the first edition of the Copa Bolivia. The Copa Bolivia would start on 24 January and end on October 31 and the final will be played at Estadio Hernando Siles.

Play-off round
The Play-off Round featured only LFPB and Copa Simón Bolívar  teams from the First and Second tiers of the Bolivian football league system. The matches were played on 24 January 1996 and end 7 February. There were two replays, with four ties requiring a penalty shootout to settle them.

Group stage

Group A

Felix Capriles is the stadium to host group A and Estadio IV Centenário to Group B the draw for the teams would take place on 5 March.

Group B

Felix Capriles is the stadium to host group A and Estadio IV Centenário to Group B the draw for the teams would take place on 5 March.

Semi-final

|}

Final

|}

Bol
Bol